The following lists events that happened in 2013 in Zimbabwe.

Incumbents
 President: Robert Mugabe 
 Prime Minister: Morgan Tsvangirai (until 11 September)
 First Vice President: Emmerson Mnangagwa
 Second Vice President: Phelekezela Mphoko

Events
 Zimbabwean general election, 2013
 Zimbabwean constitutional referendum, 2013

References

 
2010s in Zimbabwe
Zimbabwe
Zimbabwe
Years of the 21st century in Zimbabwe